Daiviet Populist Revolutionary Party, was a nationalist and anti-communist political party and militant organisation that was active in Vietnam 1943–1947.

History
This party was established in 1943 January 1 in Hòa Bình Province.
Battle at Nga-my hill (1945)
By 1945–1946, Đại Việt Duy Dân had clashed Viet Minh in many bloody battles.
Battle at Hoa-binh province (1946)
In the Hòa Bình Province battle they were vanquished by Viet Minh in 1946.
The death of Lý Đông-a (1947)
The founder, Lý Đông A, was kidnapped in 1947 and disappeared.

Conformation
Formality
 Motto : One thinking, one command (Một chủ nghĩa, một chỉ huy)
 Anthem : Spirit of the country (Hồn nước)
 Leader : Phan Bội Châu
Members
 Lý Đông A (1921–1947) : Secretary General.
 Trần Việt Hoài
 Phạm Khắc Hàm
 Đỗ Thái Nhiên
 Nguyễn Cảnh Hậu
 Dương Thanh Phong

Documents

See also
 Nationalist Party of Greater Vietnam
 Vietnamese Nationalist Party

References

 The crime of Viet Minh at Nga My hill in 1945
 The revolutionary force of Viet people
 The bloody flowers

Vietnamese nationalism
Defunct political parties in Vietnam
Anti-communism in Vietnam
Anti-communist parties
1940s disestablishments in Vietnam
1940s establishments in Vietnam
Political parties disestablished in 1947
Political parties established in 1943